John Pease may refer to:

 John Pease (sociologist) (born 1936), associate professor of sociology at the University of Maryland, College Park
 John Pease (American football) (1943–2021), retired football coach
 Beaumont Pease, 1st Baron Wardington (John William Beaumont Pease, 1869–1950), British banker

See also
Jack Pease, 1st Baron Gainford (1860–1943), British businessman and Liberal politician